Boukolion was a town of ancient Lydia, inhabited during Roman times.
 
Its site is located south of Çatal, Asiatic Turkey.

References

Populated places in ancient Lydia
Former populated places in Turkey